Ayer y hoy  (English language:Yesterday and Today) is a 1934  Argentine musical romantic drama film directed by Enrique Susini and written by José B. Cairola. The film was premièred on 25 May 1934 in Buenos Aires.

It is a tango film, based on an integral part of Argentine culture.

Overview
The plot is divided into two time-periods: 1840 to 1852 and 1914 to 1934. The first part of history passes during the government of Juan Manuel de Rosas and refers to the history of love of a woman and a young Unitarian, who is ruined when she is forced to marry a rich federàle. A daughter was born, a product of that disastrous marriage. The woman died in 1852, convinced of the love that she professed to him, the one who fought next to Urquiza in the battle of Caseros.

In the second part of history they are the descendants of those persons who face similar circumstances. There is another failed marriage, the one of the granddaughter of the aforementioned woman, with a man who leaves the union quickly. After his departure, she sets out to remake her life. Soon she will need to make a decision when facing her ex-husband, when she is in a situation another man. Finally released, she will be able to marry the man that she truly loves.

Main cast
Iván Caseros
Mario Danesi
Victoria Garabato
Miguel Faust Rocha
José Rondinella
Alicia Vignoli

External links
 

Argentine romantic musical films
1934 films
1930s Spanish-language films
1934 romantic drama films
Argentine black-and-white films
Tango films
1930s romantic musical films
Argentine romantic drama films
1930s Argentine films